Nolan Tash (born January 14, 1977) is a male beach volleyball and volleyball player from Trinidad and Tobago.

Partnering Sean Morrison, he played in the 2003 Pan American Games beach volleyball competitions, finishing in 13th position.

He won the 2007 National Beach Volleyball Championship playing with Sean Morrison.

In Indoor volleyball, he participated in the 2006 Central American and Caribbean Games, Pan-American Cup 2006 and 2008 with his National team.

Clubs
  Big SEPOS (1991–2009)

Awards

Individuals
 2010 Central American and Caribbean Games "Best Scorer"

Beach
 Trinidad and Tobago Beach Volleyball Championship 2007  Gold Medal
 Trinidad and Tobago Beach Volleyball Championship 2008  Silver Medal

References

External links
 
 
 FIVB Indoor Profile

1977 births
Living people
Trinidad and Tobago men's volleyball players
Trinidad and Tobago beach volleyball players
Men's beach volleyball players
Beach volleyball players at the 2003 Pan American Games
Pan American Games competitors for Trinidad and Tobago
Competitors at the 2006 Central American and Caribbean Games